Caenorycta is a genus of moths of the family Xyloryctidae.

Species
 Caenorycta acrostega (Diakonoff, 1966)
 Caenorycta anholochrysa (Diakonoff, 1966)
 Caenorycta dryoxantha Meyrick, 1922
 Caenorycta platyleucota Meyrick, 1938
 Caenorycta plutotera (Diakonoff, 1966)
 Caenorycta thiobapta Meyrick, 1930

References

 
Xyloryctidae
Xyloryctidae genera
Taxa named by Edward Meyrick